All In One is a 2007 album released by Whigfield, her first music project in 3 years. This album serves as a Greatest hits album, although all the tracks have been re-recorded with new sounds. It also includes two new tracks: Rainbow and Right in the Night, the latter being a cover of Jam & Spoon's song. The track listing has been chosen by the fans. The album has been released as both a digital download and a physical cd copy.

Track listing
Think of You - 3:34
Another Day - 3:35
Right In the Night - 4:20
Was a Time - 3:59
Close to You - 3:47
Saturday Night - 4:00
Rainbow - 3:51
Gotta Getcha - 4:16
No Tears to Cry - 4:02
Sexy Eyes - 3:48
Givin' All My Love - 3:44
Out of Sight - 3:50

External links
 All-In-One on Discogs
 

2007 greatest hits albums
Whigfield albums
Dance music compilation albums